The France family is known as the "first family" of NASCAR racing. NASCAR was founded by Bill France, Sr. in 1948 and to this day France family members own and operate NASCAR. Jim France, one of the sons of the founder, is the current chairman and CEO after Brian France's arrest on August 6, 2018 and subsequent leave from the position. The France family also controls International Speedway Corporation and International Motor Sports Association.

Notable family members
William Henry France (1874-1949) - Father of co-founder of NASCAR
James Edmund France (1906-1920) - Brother of co-founder of NASCAR
Bill France Sr. (1909-1992) – Co-founder, CEO and Chairman of NASCAR 
Bill France Jr. (1933-2007) – CEO of NASCAR; Chairman of ISC
Jim France (1944-) – CEO and Chairman of NASCAR, Executive vice president of NASCAR; CEO and Chairman of ISC
Lesa Kennedy (1961-) – Executive Vice President of NASCAR; President and CEO of ISC
Brian France (1962-) – Former CEO and Chairman of NASCAR
JC France (1965-)
Ben Kennedy (1991-) - Race Car Driver, General Manager of the NASCAR Camping World Truck Series

References

 
NASCAR people